SNI may refer to:

Science and technology
 Substitution nucleophilic internal, a chemistry reaction mechanism 
 Swedish Standard Industrial Classification, a Swedish economic classification system
 Server Name Indication, an extension to the TLS computer networking protocol

Companies
 Scripps Networks Interactive, a media company
 Showtime Networks Inc., an American cable network company
 Siemens Nixdorf Informationssysteme, a former computer hardware company
 Société Nationale d'Investissement, a Moroccan conglomerate
 Sports Network Incorporated, a former American media company

Organizations
 National Information Service (Brazil), or Serviço Nacional de Informações, the former name of the Brazilian Intelligence Agency
 Shelter Now International, a Christian foreign aid organization, based in Germany and historically focused on Pakistan and Afghanistan
 Sistema Nacional de Investigadores, a Mexican government agency
 Soviet Naval Infantry
 Swiss Nanoscience Institute

Other uses
 Standar Nasional Indonesia (Indonesian National Standard), formulated by the National Standardization Agency